The governor of Nayarit is the chief executive of Nayarit.

Governors of Nayarit
List of governors of Nayarit since the state's creation in 1917:

External links
Governor's web site

Nayarit